Avtar Singh Junior (born 22 January 1979) is an Indian politician and a member of INC. In 2017, he was elected as the member of the Punjab Legislative Assembly from Jalandhar North.

Career
He owns a transport company, the Kartar bus service Punjab. He is the son of Sh. Avtar Henry three time MLA from Jalandhar north and ex Cabinet minister.

Member of Legislative Assembly 
He won the Jalandhar North constituency on an INC ticket, he beat the member of the Punjab Legislative Assembly K. D. Bhandari of the BJP by over 32291 votes.

The Aam Aadmi Party gained a strong 79% majority in the sixteenth Punjab Legislative Assembly by winning 92 out of 117 seats in the 2022 Punjab Legislative Assembly election. MP Bhagwant Mann was sworn in as Chief Minister on 16 March 2022.
Committee assignments of Punjab Legislative Assembly  
Member (2022–23) Committee on Subordinate Legislation

Electoral performance

References 

Punjab, India politicians
Punjab, India MLAs 2017–2022
1979 births
Indian National Congress politicians
People from Punjab, India
Living people
Indian National Congress politicians from Punjab, India
Punjab, India MLAs 2022–2027